Women of the Weeping River is a 2016 drama film directed by Sheron Dayoc. It is set in Jolo, Sulu, with an ensemble cast of non-actors from the Western Mindanao region.

Plot
Two women in a remote Muslim community confront an escalating blood feud and reach deep into themselves in hopes to undo the feud stretching back generations.

Production
The film was shot over two weeks in July 2016, in Zamboanga City, and Jolo. The film was shot in 4K resolution with Sony A7S-II, and Panasonic Varicam LT cameras, with Leica Summicron-C lenses. The production is one of the first films using the Varicam LT. It was later presented in cinemas at 2.35 aspect ratio.

Awards and honors

QCinema International Film Festival 2016
The film won:
Best Picture
Best Actress (Laila Ulao) 
 Best Supporting Actor (Taha Daranda)

40th Gawad Urian Awards
It led with 12 nominations at the 40th Gawad Urian Awards, held at ABS-CBN Studio 10 on July 20, 2017. It won six awards including:

Best Picture
Best Director (Sheron Dayoc)
Best Screenplay (Sheron Dayoc)
Best Supporting Actress (Sharifa Pearlsia Ali-Dans)
Best Cinematography (Rommel Sales) 
Best Editing (Carlo Francisco Manatad)

Critical reception
Critics have praised the film for its portrayal of conflicts in Mindanao.

Writer Amir Mawallil opines that "What Dayoc’s oeuvre has achieved so far is its brave statement that a family is still the basic unit of our society -- and that if we dream of creating a country where peace and order is maintained, nothing is so exclusive and untouchable between two warring families—even their violence." Skilty Labastilla of the Young Critics' Circle Film Desk praises the use of amateur actors and the director's intimate knowledge of the situation in Mindanao, noting that: "Women of the Weeping River is outstanding not only because of Dayoc’s judicious handling of relevant themes (he also wrote the script) but even more so because of his exceptional grasp of film language, particularly in trusting that the scenes will work more effectively with minimal musical score, and by letting the camera patiently capture the characters’ inner turmoil through intelligent mise-en-scène and symbolic imagery. It helps that the film’s actors, mostly amateur, all deliver superb lived-in portrayals, particularly newcomer Laila Ulao as Satra." Blogger Fred Hawson praises Taha G. Daranda-Tan, who plays the patriarch in the film: "When he talks, you feel like you are listening to your own father or grandfather talk to you. He steadfastly observes the rido as it is expected of him to uphold the family honor by avenging their losses. However, you can really feel his genuine concern for his wife and family, with his sincere humility coming though when he takes responsibility for the collateral damage during the fighting."

See also
 Musmos na Sumibol sa Gubat ng Digma

References

External links

"Teaser Trailer" "YouTube"

2016 films
Philippine drama films